This is a list of seasons completed by the Old Dominion Monarchs football team of the National Collegiate Athletic Association (NCAA) Division I Football Championship Subdivision (FCS). The Monarchs fielded their first team in 1930 under Tommy Scott.

Seasons

References

Old Dominion Monarchs
 
Old Dominion Monarchs football seasons